

Scotland
Scottish Parliament elections
1999 Scottish Parliament election
2003 Scottish Parliament election
2007 Scottish Parliament election
2011 Scottish Parliament election
2016 Scottish Parliament election
2021 Scottish Parliament election

Wales
Welsh Assembly elections
1999 National Assembly for Wales election
2003 National Assembly for Wales election
2007 National Assembly for Wales election
2011 National Assembly for Wales election
2016 National Assembly for Wales election
2021 National Assembly for Wales election

Northern Ireland
Northern Ireland Assembly elections
1998 Northern Ireland Assembly election
2003 Northern Ireland Assembly election
2007 Northern Ireland Assembly election
2011 Northern Ireland Assembly election
2016 Northern Ireland Assembly election
2017 Northern Ireland Assembly election
2022 Northern Ireland Assembly election

Greater London
 Greater London Authority elections
 Mayor of London
 2000 London mayoral election
 2004 London mayoral election
 2008 London mayoral election
 2012 London mayoral election
 2016 London mayoral election
 2021 London mayoral election
 London Assembly
 2000 London Assembly election
 2004 London Assembly election
 2008 London Assembly election
 2012 London Assembly election
 2016 London Assembly election
 2021 London Assembly election
 Greater London Council elections
 1964, 1967, 1970, 1973, 1977, 1981

Local elections

Elections by year
 1973
 1975
 1976
 1995
 1997
 1998
 1999
 2000
 2001
 2002
 2003
 2004
 2005
 2006
 2007
 2008
 2009
 2010
 2011
 2013
 2014
 2015
 2016
 2017
 2018
 2019
 2021
 2022
 2023

English elections by Council
 Adur local elections
 Allerdale local elections
 Alnwick local elections
 Amber Valley local elections
 Arun local elections
 Ashfield local elections
 Ashford local elections
 Aylesbury Vale local elections
 Babergh local elections
 Barking and Dagenham local elections
 Barnet local elections
 Barnsley local elections
 Barrow-in-Furness local elections
 Basildon local elections
 Basingstoke and Deane local elections
 Bassetlaw local elections
 Bath and North East Somerset local elections
 Bedford local elections
 Bedfordshire local elections
 Berwick upon Tweed local elections
 Bexley local elections
 Birmingham local elections
 Blaby local elections
 Blackburn with Darwen local elections
 Blackpool local elections
 Blyth Valley local elections
 Bolsover local elections
 Bolton local elections
 Boston local elections
 Bournemouth, Christchurch and Poole Council elections
 Bournemouth local elections
 Bracknell Forest local elections
 Bradford local elections
 Braintree local elections
 Breckland local elections
 Brentwood local elections
 Brent local elections
 Bridgnorth local elections
 Brighton and Hove local elections
 Bristol local elections
 Broadland local elections
 Bromley local elections
 Bromsgrove local elections
 Broxbourne local elections
 Broxtowe local elections
 Buckinghamshire local elections
 Burnley local elections
 Bury local elections
 Calderdale local elections
 Cambridge local elections
 Cambridgeshire local elections
 Camden local elections
 Cannock Chase local elections
 Canterbury local elections
 Caradon local elections
 Carlisle local elections
 Carrick local elections
 Castle Morpeth local elections
 Castle Point local elections
 Central Bedfordshire local elections
 Charnwood local elections
 Chelmsford local elections
 Cheltenham local elections
 Cherwell local elections
 Cheshire local elections
 Cheshire East local elections
 Cheshire West and Chester local elections
 Chester local elections
 Chester-le-Street local elections
 Chesterfield local elections
 Chichester local elections
 Chiltern local elections
 Chorley local elections
 Christchurch local elections
 City of Durham local elections
 Colchester local elections
 Congleton local elections
 Copeland local elections
 Corby local elections
 Cornwall local elections
 Cotswold local elections
 County Durham local elections
 Coventry local elections
 Craven local elections
 Crawley local elections
 Crewe and Nantwich local elections
 Croydon local elections
 Cumbria local elections
 Dacorum local elections
 Darlington local elections
 Dartford local elections
 Daventry local elections
 Derby local elections
 Derbyshire local elections
 Derbyshire Dales local elections
 Derwentside local elections
 Devon local elections
 Doncaster local elections
 Dorset County Council elections
 Dorset Council elections
 Dover local elections
 Dudley local elections
 Ealing local elections
 Easington local elections
 East Cambridgeshire local elections
 East Devon local elections
 East Dorset local elections
 East Hampshire local elections
 East Hertfordshire local elections
 East Lindsey local elections
 East Northamptonshire local elections
 East Riding of Yorkshire local elections
 East Staffordshire local elections
 East Sussex local elections
 Eastbourne local elections
 Eastleigh local elections
 Eden local elections
 Ellesmere Port and Neston local elections
 Elmbridge local elections
 Enfield local elections
 Epping Forest local elections
 Epsom and Ewell local elections
 Erewash local elections
 Essex local elections
 Exeter local elections
 Fareham local elections
 Fenland local elections
 Forest Heath local elections
 Forest of Dean local elections
 Fylde local elections
 Gateshead local elections
 Gedling local elections
 Gloucester local elections
 Gloucestershire local elections
 Gosport local elections
 Gravesham local elections
 Great Yarmouth local elections
 Greenwich local elections
 Guildford local elections
 Hackney local elections
 Halton local elections
 Hambleton local elections
 Hammersmith and Fulham local elections
 Hampshire local elections
 Harborough local elections
 Haringey local elections
 Harlow local elections
 Harrogate local elections
 Harrow local elections
 Hart local elections
 Hartlepool local elections
 Hastings local elections
 Havant local elections
 Havering local elections
 Herefordshire local elections
 Hertfordshire local elections
 Hertsmere local elections
 High Peak local elections
 Hillingdon local elections
 Hinckley and Bosworth local elections
 Horsham local elections
 Hounslow local elections
 Huntingdonshire local elections
 Hyndburn local elections
 Ipswich local elections
 Isle of Wight local elections
 Islington local elections
 Kennet local elections
 Kensington and Chelsea local elections
 Kent local elections
 Kerrier local elections
 Kettering local elections
 King's Lynn and West Norfolk local elections
 Kingston upon Hull local elections
 Kingston upon Thames local elections
 Kirklees local elections
 Knowsley local elections
 Lambeth local elections
 Lancashire local elections
 Lancaster local elections
 Leeds local elections
 Leicester local elections
 Leicestershire local elections
 Lewes local elections
 Lewisham local elections
 Lichfield local elections
 Lincoln local elections
 Lincolnshire local elections
 Liverpool local elections
 Luton local elections
 Macclesfield local elections
 Maidstone local elections
 Maldon local elections
 Malvern Hills local elections
 Manchester local elections
 Mansfield local elections
 Medway local elections
 Melton local elections
 Mendip local elections
 Merton local elections
 Mid Bedfordshire local elections
 Mid Devon local elections
 Mid Suffolk local elections
 Mid Sussex local elections
 Middlesbrough local elections
 Milton Keynes local elections
 Mole Valley local elections
 New Forest local elections
 Newark and Sherwood local elections
 Newcastle upon Tyne local elections
 Newcastle-under-Lyme local elections
 Newham local elections
 Norfolk local elections
 North Cornwall local elections
 North Devon local elections
 North Dorset local elections
 North East Derbyshire local elections
 North East Lincolnshire local elections
 North Hertfordshire local elections
 North Kesteven local elections
 North Lincolnshire local elections
 North Norfolk local elections
 North Shropshire local elections
 North Somerset local elections
 North Tyneside local elections
 North Warwickshire local elections
 North West Leicestershire local elections
 North Wiltshire local elections
 North Yorkshire local elections
 Northampton local elections
 Northamptonshire local elections
 Northumberland local elections
 Norwich local elections
 Nottingham local elections
 Nottinghamshire local elections
 Nuneaton and Bedworth local elections
 Oadby and Wigston local elections
 Oldham local elections
 Oswestry local elections
 Oxford local elections
 Oxfordshire local elections
 Pendle local elections
 Penwith local elections
 Peterborough local elections
 Plymouth local elections
 Poole local elections
 Portsmouth local elections
 Preston local elections
 Purbeck local elections
 Reading local elections
 Redbridge local elections
 Redcar and Cleveland local elections
 Redditch local elections
 Reigate and Banstead local elections
 Restormel local elections
 Ribble Valley local elections
 Richmond upon Thames local elections
 Richmondshire local elections
 Rochdale local elections
 Rochford local elections
 Rossendale local elections
 Rother local elections
 Rotherham local elections
 Rugby local elections
 Runnymede local elections
 Rushcliffe local elections
 Rushmoor local elections
 Rutland local elections
 Ryedale local elections
 St Albans local elections
 St Edmundsbury local elections
 St Helens local elections
 Salisbury local elections
 Salford local elections
 Sandwell local elections
 Scarborough local elections
 Sedgefield local elections
 Sedgemoor local elections
 Sefton local elections
 Selby local elections
 Sevenoaks local elections
 Sheffield local elections
 Shepway local elections
 Shrewsbury and Atcham local elections
 Shropshire local elections
 Slough local elections
 Solihull local elections
 Somerset local elections
 South Bedfordshire local elections
 South Buckinghamshire local elections
 South Cambridgeshire local elections
 South Gloucestershire local elections
 South Derbyshire local elections
 South Hams local elections
 South Holland local elections
 South Kesteven local elections
 South Lakeland local elections
 South Norfolk local elections
 South Northamptonshire local elections
 South Oxfordshire local elections
 South Ribble local elections
 South Shropshire local elections
 South Somerset local elections
 South Staffordshire local elections
 South Tyneside local elections
 Southampton local elections
 Southend-on-Sea local elections
 Southwark local elections
 Spelthorne local elections
 Stafford local elections
 Staffordshire local elections
 Staffordshire Moorlands local elections
 Stevenage local elections
 Stockport local elections
 Stockton-on-Tees local elections
 Stoke-on-Trent local elections
 Stratford-on-Avon local elections
 Stroud local elections
 Suffolk local elections
 Suffolk Coastal local elections
 Sunderland local elections
 Surrey local elections
 Surrey Heath local elections
 Sutton local elections
 Swale local elections
 Swindon local elections
 Tameside local elections
 Tamworth local elections
 Tandridge local elections
 Taunton Deane local elections
 Teesdale local elections
 Teignbridge local elections
 Telford and Wrekin local elections
 Tendring local elections
 Test Valley local elections
 Tewkesbury local elections
 Thanet local elections
 Three Rivers local elections
 Thurrock local elections
 Tonbridge and Malling local elections
 Torbay local elections
 Torridge local elections
 Tower Hamlets local elections
 Trafford local elections
 Tunbridge Wells local elections
 Tynedale local elections
 Uttlesford local elections
 Vale of White Horse local elections
 Vale Royal local elections
 Wakefield local elections
 Walsall local elections
 Waltham Forest local elections
 Wandsworth local elections
 Wansbeck local elections
 Warrington local elections
 Warwick District Council elections
 Warwickshire local elections
 Watford local elections
 Waveney local elections
 Waverley local elections
 Wealden local elections
 Wear Valley local elections
 Wellingborough local elections
 Welwyn Hatfield local elections
 West Berkshire local elections
 West Devon local elections
 West Dorset local elections
 West Lancashire local elections
 West Lindsey local elections
 West Oxfordshire local elections
 West Somerset local elections
 West Sussex local elections
 West Wiltshire local elections
 Westminster local elections
 Weymouth and Portland local elections
 Wigan local elections
 Wiltshire local elections
 Winchester local elections
 Windsor and Maidenhead local elections
 Wirral local elections
 Woking local elections
 Wokingham local elections
 Wolverhampton local elections
 Worcester local elections
 Worcestershire local elections
 Worthing local elections
 Wychavon local elections
 Wycombe local elections
 Wyre local elections
 Wyre Forest local elections
 York local elections

Welsh elections by council
 Blaenau Gwent local elections
 Bridgend local elections
 Caerphilly local elections
 Cardiff local elections
 Carmarthenshire local elections
 Ceredigion local elections
 Conwy local elections
 Denbighshire local elections
 Flintshire local elections
 Gwynedd local elections
 Isle of Anglesey local elections
 Merthyr Tydfil local elections
 Monmouthshire local elections
 Neath Port Talbot local elections
 Newport local elections
 Pembrokeshire local elections
 Powys local elections
 Rhondda Cynon Taf local elections
 Swansea local elections
 Torfaen local elections
 Vale of Glamorgan local elections
 Wrexham local elections

See also
 Elections in the United Kingdom

Elections in the United Kingdom